Otisco is an unincorporated community in Charlestown Township, Clark County, Indiana.

History
Otisco was laid out in 1854 when the railroad was extended to that point. According to one source, the name might be borrowed from New York's Otisco Lake.

The Otisco post office was established in 1870.

Geography
Otisco is located at  along Indiana State Road 3 in the northern corner of Charlestown Township.  The northern fringe of the town extends into neighboring Oregon Township.

References

Unincorporated communities in Clark County, Indiana
Unincorporated communities in Indiana
Louisville metropolitan area
Populated places established in 1854
1854 establishments in Indiana